Zeng Shiqiang (28 August 1934 – 11 November 2018) was a Chinese sinologist best known for studying I Ching, the oldest of the Chinese classics. Zeng is acclaimed as having been the "Father of the Chinese Style of Management". He served as president of Hsing Kuo University of Management (HKU) and professor at National Chiao Tung University (NCTU).

Biography
Zeng was born in Zhangzhou, Fujian on 28 August 1934. After the defeat of the Nationalists by the Communists in Chinese Civil War in 1949, his family moved to Tainan County, Taiwan.  After high school, Zeng was accepted to the National Taiwan Normal University, where he majored in the Department of Industrial Education. After graduation, he taught there. He received his doctor's degree and master's degree from the University of Leicester and the Truman State University, respectively.

Zeng died at Tri-Service General Hospital in Taipei on 11 November 2018, aged 84.

Works

Personal life
Zeng married Liu Junzheng, who is also a professor.

References

1934 births
2018 deaths
Alumni of the University of Leicester
Chinese sinologists
Academic staff of the National Chiao Tung University
National Taiwan Normal University alumni
People from Zhangzhou
Taiwanese people from Fujian
Truman State University alumni
Writers from Fujian